The Blahnița is a left tributary of the Danube in Romania. It flows into the Danube near Balta Verde.

References

Rivers of Romania
Rivers of Mehedinți County